Richard Reynolds (born 15 February 1948) is an English former professional footballer who played as a striker or midfielder in a career which ran from the mid-1960s to the mid-1970s.

Career
Born in Looe, Reynolds started his career as an apprentice at Plymouth Argyle. He made his debut in an FA Cup tie against Derby County on 9 January 1965, aged 16, and signed professional forms a month later. In all Reynolds was to make over 100 appearances for The Pilgrims.

He had a loan spell at Yeovil, winning the Southern League in 1970–71. before moving to Portsmouth in the 1971 close season. He was to prove such a popular player that in 1972 he was awarded the title of Pompey's Player of the Year. Other strikers came and went.

Reynolds left Portsmouth after a Football League Tribunal in which Reynolds was awarded a substantial amount of compensation for wages he later described as "disgusting". The tribunal also instructed Portsmouth to release Reynolds from his contract as they couldn't pay him. He never received the payment owed to him.

Reynolds left Portsmouth in February 1976 to sign for the Eredivisie side Haarlem. His career was cut short by a serious knee injury sustained playing against Ajax Amsterdam.

References

Living people
1948 births
People from Looe
English footballers
Footballers from Cornwall
Association football forwards
England youth international footballers
English Football League players
Plymouth Argyle F.C. players
Yeovil Town F.C. players
Portsmouth F.C. players
HFC Haarlem players
Chichester City F.C. (1873) players
Petersfield Town F.C. players
English football managers
Chichester City F.C. (1873) managers
Petersfield Town F.C. managers
Fareham Town F.C. managers
Wick F.C. managers
Newport (IOW) F.C. managers
English expatriate footballers
English expatriate sportspeople in the Netherlands
Expatriate footballers in the Netherlands